Ogaridiscus subrupicola, common name the southern tightcoil, is a species of air-breathing land snail, a terrestrial pulmonate gastropod in the family Zonitidae. No subspecies are listed in the Catalog of Life.

Distribution
This species is endemic to the United States, occurring in the Mountain-Prairie Region:
 Idaho
 Utah, USA

References

External links
  Prest, Terrence J. "Salmon River Drainage, Idaho." Article contains description

Zonitidae
Gastropods described in 1877